Alfonso Herrera, O.S.A. (died 2 December 1602) was a Roman Catholic prelate who served as Bishop of Ariano (1585–1602) and Bishop of Gallipoli (1576–1585).

Biography
Alfonso Herrera was born in Spain and ordained a priest in the Order of Saint Augustine.
On 30 July 1576, Alfonso Herrera was appointed during the papacy of Pope Gregory XIII as Bishop of Gallipoli.
On 25 February 1585, he was transferred by Pope Gregory XIII to the diocese of Ariano.
He served as Bishop of Ariano until his death on 20 December 1602.

See also
Catholic Church in Italy

References

External links and additional sources
 (for Chronology of Bishops) 
 (for Chronology of Bishops) 
 (for Chronology of Bishops) 
 (for Chronology of Bishops) 

16th-century Italian Roman Catholic bishops
17th-century Italian Roman Catholic bishops
Bishops appointed by Pope Gregory XIII
Bishops of Ariano
Augustinian bishops
1602 deaths